The Greater Lynchburg Transit Company is the non-profit, publicly owned company responsible for providing bus service for Lynchburg, Virginia, since its creation in 1974. The GLTC Board of Directors sets and is responsible for both the general policies as well as the selection of the management company responsible for operation the service. The Board is composed of nine-members that are appointed by the Lynchburg City Council. , First Transit is responsible for the operation of the network, and their subsidiary, Central Virginia Transit Management Company is oversees the actual employment of the GLTC's bus drivers, mechanics, and other staff.

GLTC serves a population of 80,846 in an area covering , and in 2006 totaled 1,117,971 unlinked passenger trips.

Bus fleet
 3 Gillig Diesel/Electric Hybrid,  low floor buses
 14 Gillig Diesel/Electric Hybrid,  low floor buses
 7 Gillig Diesel/Electric Hybrid,  low floor buses
 10 Gillig Diesel,  low floor buses
 12 Ford/Supreme, E-450,  (in operation for paratransit)
 1 Chance, VS-24 replica trolley

Routes

Liberty University shuttle service
On November 10, 2006, the GLTC entered an agreement with Liberty University to operate the  shuttle bus service on its campus. Service would commence on January 15, 2007, with six buses serving the campus. The service operates from 7 a.m. to midnight Monday through Thursday; from 7 a.m. to 1 a.m. Friday and Saturday; and from 8 a.m. to 10 p.m. Saturday and Sunday. Serving Liberty's main, north and east campuses, the system originally consisted of eight stops. Costing $1,000,000 annually for the service, Liberty students and employees can utilize the shuttle service without paying a fare each time.

By November 2007, the service saw its 1,000,000th passenger, which doubled the average annual ridership for the GLTC as a whole. With ridership for the service growing from 3,900 passengers per day in spring 2007 to 7,400 in fall 2007, university officials are working in conjunction with the GLTC to expand the service to include areas off campus in the area around the university.

See also
 Transportation in Virginia

References

External links
 Greater Lynchburg Transit Company official website

Bus transportation in Virginia
University and college bus systems
Transportation in Lynchburg, Virginia
1974 establishments in Virginia